Gurchuiyeh (also Romanized as Gūrchū’īyeh and Goorchoo’eyeh; also known as Gūrchu and Qūrchū) is a village in Kavirat Rural District, Chatrud District, Kerman County, Kerman Province, Iran. At the 2006 census, its population was 539, in 128 families.

References 

Populated places in Kerman County